Nagylak ( or ) is a village in Csongrád-Csanád County, in the Southern Great Plain region of southern Hungary.

Geography

References

Populated places in Csongrád-Csanád County
Hungary–Romania border crossings
Romanian communities in Hungary